Lábrea is the southernmost municipality in the Brazilian state of Amazonas.

Economy

The  population of the Lábrea municipality was 46,882 as of 2020.
This makes it the sixth largest municipality in Amazonas by area and the tenth largest in Brazil.  
The town is the seat of the Territorial Prelature of Lábrea.
Lábrea Airport is served by scheduled regular air connections.

Conservation

The municipality contains the Iquiri National Forest, a  sustainable use conservation unit created in 2008.
The municipality also contains part of the Mapinguari National Park, a  conservation unit created in 2008.
It contains the  Ituxi Extractive Reserve, created in 2008.
It contains 91% of the  Médio Purus Extractive Reserve, created in 2008.

Climate
Lábrea has a tropical monsoon climate (Köppen Am) with consistently hot temperatures and very oppressive humidity.

References

Municipalities in Amazonas (Brazilian state)
Populated places established in 1881
1881 establishments in Brazil